Small House may refer to::

In the United States
Small House (Macon, Georgia)
Small-Towle House, Wilmington, Illinois
Dutton-Small House, Vassalboro, Maine
Milton Small House, Raleigh, North Carolina
Charles and Eleanor Small House, Belle Fourche, South Dakota, listed on the National Register of Historic Places (NRHP)
Small-Elliott House, Walla Walla, Washington, listed on the NRHP

Elsewhere
Small house (Zimbabwe), sociological phenomenon

See also
Small house movement
Small House Policy of Hong Kong
The Small House at Allington, a novel by Anthony Trollope